HK Ozolnieki/Monarch (also HK Ozolnieki/Monarhs) was a Latvian ice hockey club from Ozolnieki, founded in 2008. Formally the club was established as HK Vilki in 2000, but the roots of the team date back to a team called AK-2, founded in Riga in 1987. The owner of the club during its stay in Ozolnieki was 7-time NHL All-star defenseman Sandis Ozoliņš.

The team folded before the start of the 2014–15 Latvian Hockey League season.

Previous names 

 1987: AK-2
 1990s: Saurieši
 1994–2000: Nik's/Brih
 2000–2006: Vilki/OP
 2006–2008: Vilki/Monarch

Ice hockey clubs established in 2000
Ice hockey teams in Riga
Ice hockey teams in Latvia